Robert William Menham (7 July 1871 – 1945) was an English footballer who played in the Football League for Everton. Menham played in the 1897 FA Cup Final defeat against Aston Villa.

References

1871 births
1945 deaths
English footballers
Association football goalkeepers
English Football League players
Everton F.C. players
Wigan County F.C. players
Swindon Town F.C. players
FA Cup Final players